This is a list of films produced in the Netherlands during the 1970s. The films are produced in the Dutch language.

1970s
Films
Dutch